Atatürk University is a land-grant university established in 1957 in Erzurum, Turkey. The university consists of 23 faculties, 18 colleges, 8 institutes and 30 research centers. Atatürk University's main campus is in Erzurum, one of the largest cities in Eastern Anatolia. It is now one of the city's most significant resources. Since its establishment in 1957, it has served as a hub of educational and cultural excellence for the eastern region.

History

At the beginning of the Turkey Republic, the importance of building a regional university in Eastern Anatolia was expressed by the founder of the Republic, Atatürk, in his opening speech on Grand National Assembly of Turkey on 1 November 1937. However, implementation of this idea was delayed due to World War II. After twenty years, in 1957, building the first structures of Atatürk University has started and it was completed in 1970. Initially, the university begun by teaching 135 students in the Faculty of Agriculture and Faculty of Science and Literature. As of 2016–2017 academic year, approximately 280,000 students, 2,610 faculty members, 22 faculties, 18 colleges, 8 institutes and 30 research centers had over 170 thousand graduates in total since beginning.

Affiliations
The university is twinned with and has agreement of cooperation with the University of Nebraska and the Balkan Universities Network.

The university is a member of the Caucasus University Association.

Academic units

Faculties
Distance Education Faculty
Faculty of Architecture and Design
Faculty of Agriculture
Faculty of Sciences
Faculty of Literature
Faculty of Economics and Business Administration
Faculty of Medicine
Faculty of Dentistry
Kazım Karabekir Faculty of Education
Faculty of Earth Sciences
Faculty of Engineering
Faculty of Theology
Faculty of Fine Arts
Faculty of Fisheries
Faculty of Communications
Faculty of Pharmacy
Faculty of Veterinary
Faculty of Laws
Oltu Faculty of Geosciences
Faculty of Health Sciences
Sports Science Faculty
Faculty of Tourism

Colleges
College of Nursing
College of Physical Education and Sports
Erzurum College of Health
College of Foreign Languages
College of Tourism and Hotel Management
Turkish Music State Conservatory

Vocational colleges
Vocational School of Justice
Erzurum Vocational College
Erzurum Vocational College of Health Services
High school of Physical Education and Sports
Aşkale Vocational College
Hınıs Vocational College
İspir Hamza Polat Vocational College
Narman Vocational College
Oltu Vocational College
Horasan Vocational College
Şenkaya Vocational College
Pasinler Vocational College

Institutes
Institute of Atatürk's Doctrines and History of Reforms
Institute of Sciences
Institute of Educational Sciences
Institute of Fine Arts
Institute of Health Sciences
Institute of Social Sciences
Institute of Turcology
Winter Sports Institute

Research and Application Centers
Acupuncture and Complementary Medical Methods Application and Research Center
Eurasia Silk Road Universities Application and Research Center
Astrophysics Research and Application Center
Health Research and Applications Center
Earthquake Research Center
Environmental Problem Research Center
Biotechnology Research Center
Eastern Anatolia High Technology Application and Research Center
Nano Science and Nano Engineering Research and Application Center
Computer Science Application and Research Center
Language Education Application and Research Center
Disabled, Elderly and Veteran Research and Excellence Research and Application Center
Ibrahim Hakki Research Center
Human Values Education Application and Research Center
Women's Issues Research and Application Center
European Communities Application and Research Center
Middle East and Central Asia - Caucasus Research and Application Center
Organ Transplant Education Research and Application Center
Turkish Armenian Relations Research Center
Social Research Application and Research Center
University Industry Cooperation Development Center
Medical Aromatic Plant-Drug Research Center
Agricultural Research and Publication Center
Medical Experimental Application and Research Center
Carpet Training Center
Occupational Health and Safety Practice and Research Center
Strategic Research Center
Continuing Education Application and Research Center
Distance Learning Application and Research Center
Gifted Education Research and Application Center

Facilities

Atatürk University offers many facilities to the university students to make their life more convenient and easier. It has one of the biggest training and research hospitals in Turkey. The university hospital in the center has an important health center role for all Eastern Anatolia and Eastern Black Sea. The students who are under 25 years can utilize the health care services free and these medical services are available 24 hours. In addition, there are several kinds of social facilities in the campus area such as movie theaters, fitness centers, Olympic swimming pools and bowling center. Moreover, the university offers some courses, such as traditional folk dances, Turkish folk music, western music and theater, to the people are interested. Throughout the year, Atatürk University campus can host many cultural festivals, concerts, celebration ceremonies, exhibitions and other such that kind of activities.
In the Atatürk University campus, 4 grand refectories, 40 canteens, 5 restaurants and 7 cafes are serving multi-choice food alternatives at relatively cheap prices.
The university has one of the richest and most distinguished libraries. The library, which is a member of Online National Academic Information Network, has many collections, records, handcrafts and historical books. In addition, the library provides students both private and common study rooms.
Atatürk University also provides exchange programs with EU countries under the Erasmus pilot project. There are 2,323 thousand international students are studying in different departments. These students consist of 1,366 undergraduate, 423 graduate and 451 doctorate students.

 Eastern Anatolia Observatory, a proposed astronomical observatory.

Notable alumni

References

External links
http://www.atauni.edu.tr/index_2.html
https://web.archive.org/web/20180113070432/http://eobs.atauni.edu.tr/Learn.aspx?Learn=4
http://www.studyinturkey.gov.tr/profiles/info/216

 
Buildings and structures in Erzurum
1957 establishments in Turkey
Educational institutions established in 1957
University